Justen Shelden Kranthove (born 19 September 2000) is a Dutch professional footballer who plays as a centre-back for FK Humenné, on loan from Slovan Liberec.

Career
As a youth player, Kranthove joined the academy of Dutch sixth division side AFC '34. In 2018, he joined the youth academy of Leicester City in the English Premier League.

In 2021, he signed for Czech club Slovan Liberec. On 31 July 2021, Kranthove debuted for Liberec during a 5–0 loss to Sparta (Prague).

References

External links
 
 

Living people
2000 births
Dutch footballers
Association football defenders
FC Slovan Liberec players
FK Humenné players
Czech First League players
Dutch expatriate footballers
Dutch expatriate sportspeople in England
Dutch expatriate sportspeople in the Czech Republic
Dutch expatriate sportspeople in Slovakia
Expatriate footballers in England
Expatriate footballers in the Czech Republic
Expatriate footballers in Slovakia
Footballers from Amsterdam
AFC '34 players
Bohemian Football League players